Brad Evans (born 24 March 1997) is a Zimbabwean cricketer. He made his first-class debut on 1 April 2018 for Cardiff MCCU against Gloucestershire as part of the Marylebone Cricket Club University fixtures. In December 2020, he was selected to play for the Eagles in the 2020–21 Logan Cup. He made his Twenty20 debut on 10 April 2021, for Eagles, in the 2020–21 Zimbabwe Domestic Twenty20 Competition. He made his List A debut on 18 April 2021, for Eagles, in the 2020–21 Pro50 Championship. Evans was also named as a standby player in Zimbabwe's squad for their Twenty20 International (T20I) series against Pakistan.

Career
In May 2022, Evans was named in Zimbabwe's T20I squad for their five-match home series against Namibia. Evans made his T20I debut on 21 May 2022, for Zimbabwe against Namibia. In August 2022, he was named in Zimbabwe's ODI squad, for their series against Bangladesh. He made his ODI debut on 7 August 2022, for Zimbabwe against Bangladesh. He took his career best 5–54 in the third ODI against a powerful Indian side in Harare sports club within 2 weeks of his debut.

On 4 February 2023, Evans made his Test debut against the West Indies.

References

External links
 

1997 births
Living people
Zimbabwean cricketers
Zimbabwe Twenty20 International cricketers
Zimbabwe One Day International cricketers
Cardiff MCCU cricketers
Mashonaland Eagles cricketers